Joanne Dow (born March 19, 1964) is an American former athlete who competed in racewalking. She made her first Olympic team at the age of 44, competing in the 20 kilometer walk for the United States at the 2008 Beijing Olympics. She placed 30th with a time of 1:34:15.

Early life and education
Born in Manchester, New Hampshire, Dow graduated from Trinity High School in Manchester in 1982. She graduated from the University of New Hampshire in 1986. Dow was a sprinter and swimmer in college.

Racewalking
Dow took up the sport of racewalking in 1994. She placed fourth in the 20 km walk at the 2000 U.S. Olympic Trials and second at the 2004 U.S. Olympic Trials Dow was a sprinter and swimmer in college. Dow won indoor national championships in 1999, 2002, 2003, 2004, 2006 and outdoor national championships in 1998, 2002, and 2006.

Later career
Dow was a Health teacher at Pembroke Academy in New Hampshire.  She later worked at Auburn Village School in NH.

Achievements

References

External links

Joanne Dow:USA Track & Field
NBC Olympics Profile

1964 births
Living people
Athletes (track and field) at the 1999 Pan American Games
Athletes (track and field) at the 2003 Pan American Games
Athletes (track and field) at the 2008 Summer Olympics
Olympic track and field athletes of the United States
American female racewalkers
Pan American Games medalists in athletics (track and field)
Pan American Games bronze medalists for the United States
Goodwill Games medalists in athletics
Competitors at the 1998 Goodwill Games
Medalists at the 2003 Pan American Games
21st-century American women